was a Japanese daimyō of the Sengoku period, who was the head of the Ashina clan.

Family
 Great-great-great-great-great-grandfather: Ashina Morimune
 Great-great-great-great-grandfather: Ashina Naomori (1323–1391)
 Great-great-great-grandfather: Ashina Norimori (1346–1407)
 Great-great-grandfather: Ashina Morimune (1386–1434)
 Great-grandfather: Ashina Morinobu (1408–1451)
 Grandfather: Ashina Moriakira (1431–1466)
 Grandmother: Daughter of Miura Takaaki
 Father: Ashina Moritaka (1448–1518)
 Mother: daughter of Uesugi Fusasada
 Wife: daughter of Kanagami Morioki
 Concubine: Kawano Gozen
 Children:
 Ashina Moriuji (1521–1580) by daughter of Kanagami Morioki
 Ashina Ujikata (1516–1561) by Kawano Gozen
 Daughter married Horiuchi Chikatane

References

Daimyo
1490 births
1553 deaths
Ashina clan